"Leonard" is a song written and recorded by American country music artist Merle Haggard.  It was released in February 1981 as the third single from the album Back to the Barrooms.  The song reached No. 9 on the Billboard Hot Country Singles & Tracks chart.

Content
The song is a tribute to songwriter Tommy Collins, and Merle references his band The Strangers in the lyrics.

Chart performance

References

1981 singles
1980 songs
Merle Haggard songs
Songs written by Merle Haggard
Song recordings produced by Jimmy Bowen
MCA Records singles